Le Boucher is a 1970 French psychological thriller film written and directed by Claude Chabrol. Set in the village of Trémolat on the river Dordogne, it tells the story of a deeply troubled butcher (Jean Yanne) who falls in love with the head teacher of the school (Stéphane Audran) but she, though happy to be a close friend, refuses a physical relationship. The film had a total of 1,148,554 admissions in France.

Plot
At the wedding of the assistant teacher of the village school, the head teacher is placed next to the butcher. She is Hélène, close to age 30 and single, who gets happily tipsy. He is Popaul who, after 15 years in the army, has just come home to take over the family shop and falls instantly for his attractive neighbour. Over the next few weeks they see more of each other, sharing meals, going to the cinema, and exchanging little presents. She says she is no prude, but after an unhappy affair does not want him to touch her. He says he joined the army to get away from a hateful father and repeatedly dwells on awful things he saw in Indochina and Algeria.

The peace of the friendly little village is however shattered when a young woman's body is found, killed by a knife, and the police cannot come up with a suspect. When Hélène takes the school for a picnic on a hillside, blood from a second freshly-killed corpse drips onto the children. It is the bride of the assistant teacher, and at the site Hélène finds an unusual cigarette lighter she gave to Popaul. Keeping quiet about it to the police, she hides it in a drawer at home. 
Next time Popaul calls to see her, she asks him to light her cigarette and he does it with an identical lighter. She relaxes, confident that the lighter beside the murdered woman was not his.

He offers to paint her ceiling, coming round to do it one evening when she has to go into town. Looking for a cloth to clean up with, he finds the lighter she had hidden and pockets it. When she gets home and finds the lighter gone, she realises that he knows she can identify him as the murderer. She starts locking all her doors and windows, but he is already in the house and, cornering her at knife point, starts trying to explain what drives him to do these things. When she breaks into tears over his suffering, he thrusts the knife into his abdomen.

She drags him into her car and rushes off to hospital. During the drive, he confesses more of the huge psychic burden he has laboured under: On arrival he asks her to give him their first kiss on the lips, after which he dies.

Cast
Stéphane Audran as Hélène Daville
Jean Yanne as Paul Thomas, known as Popaul

Awards
 1970 : Silver Shell for Best Actress at the San Sebastián International Film Festival for Stéphane Audran.
 1971 : Bodil Award for Best Non-American Film for Claude Chabrol.

References

External links

 

1970 films
1970s psychological thriller films
1970s French-language films
French psychological thriller films
Italian psychological thriller films
French serial killer films
Films directed by Claude Chabrol
Films set in France
1970s serial killer films
Italian serial killer films
1970s Italian films
1970s French films